Arena Bowl '88 (or Arena Bowl II) was the Arena Football League's second championship game. The game featured the number 2 Detroit Drive (9–3) against the number 1 Chicago Bruisers (10–1–1). With 37 combined points it is the lowest-scoring ArenaBowl in history. Chicago's 13 points are the fewest points by a single team in Arenabowl history.

Game summary
The Drive scored first when Quarterback Rich Ingold on a one-yard touchdown run, while the Bruisers scored with Quarterback Ben Bennett completing a three-yard touchdown pass to WR/DB Mike McDade.  

In the second quarter, Detroit took control with FB/LB Walter Holman getting an eight-yard touchdown run, while fellow FB/LB Jim Browne got a two-yard touchdown run.

After a scoreless third quarter, Chicago managed to respond with FB/LB Billy Stone getting a 10-yard touchdown run (with a failed two-point conversion).

Afterwards, the Drive wrapped up its first ArenaBowl title with kicker Novo Bojovic getting a 17-yard field goal.

Scoring summary
1st Quarter
 DET - Ingold 1 run (Bojovic kick)
 CHI - McDade 3 pass from Bennett (Morales kick)
2nd Quarter
 DET - Holman 8 run (Bojovic kick)
 DET - Browne 2 run (Bojovic kick)
4th Quarter
 CHI - Stone 10 run (Morales kick failed)
 DET - FG Bojovic 5

External links
 ArenaFan box score

002
1988 Arena Football League season
Massachusetts Marauders
Chicago Bruisers
1988 in Illinois
Sports competitions in Illinois
1988 in American television
July 1988 sports events in the United States